The Dictionary of African Christian Biography (DACB) is a biographical dictionary which focuses on the lives of African Christians and foreign Christian missionaries to Africa. Its biographical stories are published in English, French, Portuguese, and Swahili.

History 
The DACB was initially conceived in 1995 at the Overseas Ministries Study Center, then based in New Haven, Connecticut, and eventually launching in 1998.

Since 2012, it has been associated with the Center for Global Christianity and Mission at Boston University. The project has also helped to inspire the creation of the Biographical Dictionary of Chinese Christianity

See also
 Christianity in Africa

References

External links
 

Religious biographical dictionaries
Christianity in Africa